Colombia has 18 holidays (12 Catholic holidays and 6 Civic holidays), plus Palm and Easter Sunday. The city of Barranquilla has 2 extra holidays celebrating Monday and Tuesday of Carnival.

The following are public holidays in Colombia:
 Año Nuevo / (New Year's Day) (January 1) 
 Día de los Reyes Magos / (Epiphany) (January 6[1])
 Día de San José / (Saint Joseph's Day) (March 19[1])
 Jueves Santo / (Maundy Thursday) (Thursday before Easter Sunday, variable dates in March or April)
 Viernes Santo (Good Friday) (Friday before Easter Sunday, variable dates in March or April)
 Primero de Mayo / (Labour Day) (May 1)
 Ascensión del señor / (Ascension of Jesus) (39 days after Easter Sunday)
 Corpus Christi (60 days after Easter Sunday)
 Sagrado Corazón /( Sacred Heart) (68 days after Easter Sunday)
 San Pedro y San Pablo / Saint Peter and Saint Paul) (June 29)
 Declaración de la Independencia de Colombia / Declaration of Independence (July 20)
 Battle of Boyacá (August 7)
 La Asunción / (Assumption of Mary) (August 15)
 Día de la Raza / (Columbus Day) (October 12)
 Día de los Santos /  All Saints’ Day (November 1)
 Independencia de Cartagena / Independence of Cartagena (November 11)
 La Inmaculada Concepción (Immaculate Conception) (December 8)
 Navidad (Christmas) (December 25)

The following are considered holidays only in the city of Barranquilla:
 Monday of Carnival (48 days before Easter Sunday or 2 days before Ash Wednesday.)
 Tuesday of Carnival (47 days before Easter Sunday or the day before Ash Wednesday.)

Notes

 
Colombian culture
Colombia
Holidays